Robert A. Schriesheim (born 1960) is an American business executive.  According to a published interview with FTI Consulting in November 2021 he has served as a board director of 11 public companies, including as board chairman, and as a CFO of 4 public companies with revenues from approximately $1 billion to over $40 billion. He is chairman of Truax Partners LLC and has partnered with institutional investors leading large enterprises through complex transformations serving in various executive leadership and board roles. According to a 2016 Wall Street Journal article, he has a "history of working in partnership with private equity firms, hedge funds and institutional investors in special situation circumstances". According to Barron's and CFO magazine, Schriesheim has "spent most of his career at the high end of the strategy spectrum, embroiled in complex restructurings" focused on capital allocation.

Career
Schriesheim currently serves as a board member of a portfolio of publicly traded companies including Houlihan Lokey, an international investment banking firm and Skyworks Solutions, a global provider of semiconductors to the mobile communications market. Schriesheim served as the full-time chairman of the finance committee of the board and was credited with leading the corporate restructuring of Frontier Communications, a Fortune 500 telecommunications services provider during which, according to a November 2021 interview with FTI Consulting, $5 billion in market value was generated and was recognized with the 2021 M&A Advisor’s Annual Turnaround Award for Telecommunications Services Deal of the Year.

Other boards he has served on include NII Holdings, formerly known as Nextel International, a provider of wireless communications services in Latin America, primarily in Brazil acquired by América Móvil; FirstAdvantage, a portfolio company of private equity firm Symphony Technology Group, which is an international provider of employee screening solutions acquired by Silver Lake; Outcome Health a digital media company operating a patient point-of-care health intelligence platform where he was an investor designated board representative of an equity investor consortium including Goldman Sachs Investment Partners, CapitalG (formerly Google Capital) and Pritzker Venture Capital Group.  Previously, he also served as a board director of a number of public companies including Forest City Realty Trust where he was nominated by Starboard Value and which was subsequently sold to Brookfield Asset Management, Lawson Software, Inc.; Georgia Gulf Corp, now known as Axiall; Co-chairman of MSC Software, acquired by Symphony Technology Group and Elliott Associates; Dobson Communications, acquired by ATT; Golden Telecom, Acquired by VimpelCom; and Global Telesystems, a European communications provider, backed by Soros Private Equity Affiliates which was acquired by KPNQwest.

Until 2016, Schriesheim served as executive vice president and chief financial officer of troubled Sears Holdings Corporation which was controlled by chairman and CEO Edward S. Lampert. During Schriesheim's tenure, Sears managed its balance sheet  and reconfigured its asset portfolio as part of a strategic transformation including the spin-offs of Lands' End, Sears Canada, Sears Hometown and Outlet Stores, Orchard Supply Hardware and the separation of Seritage Growth Properties, a public REIT. According to an article published in The Wall Street Journal on May 26, 2016, and other publications, Schriesheim was described as having been selected by Eddie Lampert as CFO in 2011 and raised $9 billion of capital through various spin-offs and financings — and departed Sears in October 2016 to focus on his board director portfolio. Two years after Schriesheim's departure in 2016, Sears Holdings filed for Chapter 11 in October 2018.

Prior to joining Sears Holdings, Schriesheim was senior vice president and chief financial officer for publicly traded global human resources business services provider Hewitt Associates until its sale to Aon.  Prior to Hewitt, Schriesheim was a board member, executive vice president and chief financial officer of Lawson Software, a publicly traded Enterprise Resource Planning software provider until its acquisition by Infor Global Solutions and Golden Gate Capital.

Education
He attended the Pingry School, a college preparatory school in New Jersey, graduating in 1978, graduated from Princeton University with a degree in chemistry and from the University of Chicago Booth School of Business with an MBA.
 While at Princeton he was a member of the Princeton Men's Varsity Swim team.

Notable roles 
Schriesheim led the corporate restructuring of Frontier Communications a Fortune 500 nationwide telecommunications provider with over $7 billion in revenue as the full time finance committee chairman overseeing the refreshment of the board of directors, installation of a new CEO, implementation of an operational turnaround plan, initiating a new strategy for reinvestment while concurrently recapitalizing an over levered balance sheet. According to a published interview with FTI Consulting in November 2021, the company moved through a pre-arranged chapter 11 process emerging in April 2021 resulting in the reduction of $10 billion in debt from the $17.5 billion at the start of the restructuring while generating $5 billion in market value for the benefit of the bond holders.

He was named as executive vice president and chief financial officer of Sears Holdings in August 2011 to navigate Sears through a corporate transformation according to a release issued by Sears. Sears Holdings operating through 2,000 Sears and Kmart stores with total 2011 revenues of $41 billion and approximately 200,000 employees. Sears Holdings was formed in 2005 through the merger of Kmart and Sears engineered by billionaire investor and financier Edward S. Lampert who served as chairman and CEO of Sears Holdings, and whose board included, amongst others, Tom Tisch, an investor and heir to the Lawrence Tisch family who served as chancellor of Brown University, Steven Mnuchin who served as Treasury Secretary of the United States and Paul DePodesta an American sports executive.

Before Sears, he was CFO of Hewitt Associates reporting to CEO Russell P. Fradin. Hewitt was an NYSE-listed public company and the world's leading global provider of human resources and outsourcing solutions with $3B+ in revenues and 23,000 employees in 30 countries. Within 6 months of Schriesheim joining Hewitt, it was announced, in July 2010 that Aon Corporation would acquire Hewitt for $4.9 billion in a transaction that closed in October 2010 at a 41% premium to the prior day's closing price resulting in $1.5 billion of shareholder value.

Prior to Hewitt, he was executive vice president and chief financial officer from 2006 to 2009, and a board director of Lawson Software from 2006 until July 2011. In a Barron's article Schriesheim was credited for the turnaround in financial performance. Lawson's investors included Forbes 400 billionaire Romesh T. Wadhwani through his private equity firm Symphony Technology Group with Wadhwani serving Lawson as Co-Chairman. Lawson announced its sale April 2011 to software company Infor Global Solutions (backed by private equity firm Golden Gate Capital) for $2 billion  for a 14% premium to the stock price before speculation and 35% premium to the 52-week average closing price. Billionaire investor Carl Icahn had earlier taken a 10.9% stake in the company and supported the sale to Infor.

He was named a board director of MSC Software, a global provider of simulation software, in December 2007 and was later named co-chairman. In May 2008 activist hedge fund Elliott Associates founded by billionaire investor Paul Singer disclosed it held a 5.5% stake in MSC Software.  MSC was sold to private equity firm Symphony Technology Group, controlled by Romesh T. Wadhwani, for $390 million in 2009 with an interesting twist being that financing was provided by activist hedge fund Elliott Associates.

He was a board director of Dobson Communications – the largest independent rural wireless provider in the US with over $1 billion in revenues from 2004 until its sale in 2007 to ATT for $5.1 billion resulting in $2.5 billion of shareholder value creation.

In addition Schriesheim has been a board member of Skyworks Solutions an innovator of high reliability analog and mixed signal semiconductors since 2006.

From 1999 to 2002, Schriesheim was executive vice president, CFO and a board member of NYSE-listed Global TeleSystems ("GTS") (the owner of Ebone a European broadband optical and IP network service provider. He was brought in to help restructure and refocus the company. GTS was a pan-European communications services provider, backed by hedge fund Investor and Philanthropist Alan B. Slifka and affiliates of Forbes 400 billionaire hedge fund  Investor and Philanthropist George Soros and Soros Private Equity. GTS had revenues of over $1 billion and operations in 20 countries in Europe as well as a NASDAQ-listed subsidiary, Golden Telecom, which held communications assets in Russia. GTS was a portfolio of communications assets in Western and Eastern Europe which went through an IPO in 1998. It subsequently experienced challenges with an over-levered balance sheet as Europe went through deregulation of the communications industry and was impacted by the dot.com downturn. In 2001, to facilitate the sale, GTS undertook a pre-arranged filing under Chapter 11 of the United States Bankruptcy Code (U.S.B.C.) and, in prearranged proceedings, a petition for surseance (moratorium), offering a composition, in the Netherlands to restructure its debt, in excess of $2 billion. All proceedings were approved, confirmed and completed by March 31, 2002 as part of the sale of the company to KPNQwest.

Earlier in his career he was affiliated with Brooke Group, a Leveraged buyout firm controlled by Bennett S. LeBow. Investor Bennett S. LeBow acquired control of Western Union through an outside of chapter 11 process that included the concurrent acquisition of the international telex operations of ITT as part of a complex leveraged recapitalization that was financed by Drexel Burnham and Michael Milken in a process that included many prominent investors who had also attempted to acquire control including Richard Rainwater and Jay Pritzker. LeBow installed Schriesheim at Western Union from 1987 to 1990  as a special adviser to CEO Robert J. Amman to help oversee a restructuring of the company. They executed a strategy of redirecting Western Union from being an asset-based provider of communications services into a provider of consumer-based money transfer financial services and divested the company's telecommunications assets. Ultimately, LeBow's $25 million investment to acquire control of Western Union in 1987 was rewarded when the company was acquired by First Financial Management in 1993 for $1.15 billion also making Carl Icahn a return of 3 to 4 times his investment in the bonds in the process. First Financial Management was subsequently acquired in 1995 by First Data Corp in a $6.6 billion merger.

Early life and family 
Schriesheim was raised in Summit, New Jersey, a suburb of New York City, by parents Beatrice and Dr. Alan Schriesheim who were scientists and educators and he has an older sister.  His father is Dr. Alan Schriesheim the Director emeritus and retired CEO of Argonne National Laboratory, and an internationally noted chemist. In 2008 The Schriesheim Distinguished Graduate Fellowship was established at the Eberly College of Science at Penn State University. His mother Beatrice Schriesheim was a long-time high school chemistry teacher committed to improving science education in the United States. She was born in 1930 in Poland and survived the Holocaust by escaping the Nazi invasion in 1939, surviving imprisonment in Siberia and arriving in the US in 1947. Her memoirs, "Bea's Journey", documented her Holocaust journey and her life in the United States. They were self-published in 2003 after her death at the age of 73.

References

External links 
 CFO Magazine Profile "A CFO's Strategy: Verticals within Verticals" November 12, 2009 http://www.cfo.com/article.cfm/14455175 
 Barron's May 28, 2007 "SAP, Oracle and...Who?" http://online.barrons.com/article/SB118014674191715517.html?mod=seekingalpha

1960 births
Living people
American financial businesspeople
20th-century American Jews
Pingry School alumni
Princeton University alumni
University of Chicago Booth School of Business alumni
21st-century American Jews